Minuscule 892 (in the Gregory-Aland numbering), ε 1016 (Soden). It is a Greek minuscule manuscript of the New Testament, on 353 parchment leaves (23.5 cm by 11.5 cm). It is dated palaeografically to the 9th century.

Description 

The codex contains almost complete text of the four Gospels with some lacunae. The texts of John 10:6-12:18 and 14:23-end were inserted by later hand (on paper, about the 16th century). The text is written in one column per page, in 20 lines per page, in minuscule letters.

It includes the text of the Pericope Adulterae (John 7:53-8:11) (the first important Greek-only manuscript to have the pericope), Matthew 16:2b–3, Luke 22:43–44, 23:34, and of course Mark 16:9-20. All these texts were questioned by early Alexandrian manuscripts. In this manuscript was omitted interpolation of the Alexandrian text-type in Matthew 27:49.

Words in this codex are written continuously without separation. Hermann von Soden observed that the manuscript preserved the division in pages and lines of its uncial parent. The Ammonian sections and the Eusebian Canons were given in the left-hand margin.

Synaxarion and Menologion were added in the 13th century. John 10:6-12:18; 14:24-21:25 was added by later hand in the 16th century.

Text 

The Greek text of the codex, is a representative of the late Alexandrian text-type, with some the Byzantine readings. It is one of the most important of all minuscule manuscripts. It contains many remarkable readings of an early type. According to the Claremont Profile Method it represents the Alexandrian text-type as a core member.

It is probably the best survived minuscule witness to the Gospels. Aland placed it in Category II.

Matthew 19:16
 διδασκαλε (teacher) — א, B, D, L, f1, 892txt, 1010, 1365, ℓ 5, ita, d, e, ff1, copbo, eth, geo, Origen, Hilary;
 διδασκαλε αγαθε (good teacher) — C, K, W, Δ, Θ, f13, 28, 33, 565, 700, 892mg, 1009, 1071, 1079, 1195, 1216, 1230, 1241, 1242, 1253, 1344, 1546, 1646, 2148, 2174, Byz, Lect, it, vg, syr, copsa, arm, eth, Diatessaron.

In Mark 6:33 it has textual reading ἐκεῖ καὶ προῆλθον αὐτούς along with Codex Sinaiticus, Codex Vaticanus, 0187 (omit εκει), ℓ 49, ℓ 69, ℓ 70, ℓ 299, ℓ 303, ℓ 333, ℓ 1579, (ℓ 950 αυτους), itaur, vg, (copsa, bo).

In Mark 10:7 phrase και προσκολληθησεται προς την γυναικα αυτου (and be joined to his wife) is omitted, as in codices Codex Sinaiticus, Vaticanus, Codex Athous Lavrensis, ℓ 48, syrs, goth.

In Luke 4:17 it has textual variant καὶ ἀνοίξας τὸ βιβλίον (and opened the book) together with the manuscripts A, B, L, W, Ξ, 33, 1195, 1241, ℓ 547, syrs, h, pal, copsa, bo, against variant καὶ ἀναπτύξας τὸ βιβλίον (and unrolled the book) supported by א, Dc, K, Δ, Θ, Π, Ψ, f1, f13, 28, 565, 700, 1009, 1010 and many other manuscripts.

In John 1:28 it has textual variant Βηθαραβα together with the Codex Sinaiticus (second corrector), syrh and several other manuscripts.

In John 6:1 it reads της θαλασσης της Γαλιλαιας εις τα μερη της Τιβεριαδος – along with Codex Bezae, Θ, 1009, 1230, 1253.

History 

The codex was acquired by the British Museum in 1887 from H. L. Dupuis. Now it is located in the British Library (Add. 33277) at London.

It was examined by J. Rendel Harris.

See also 
 List of New Testament minuscules
 Textual criticism
 Biblical manuscript

References

Further reading 

 J. Rendel Harris, An Important MS of the New Testament, JBL, IX (1890), pp. 31–59.
 Hermann von Soden, Die Schriften des Neuen Testaments in ihrer ältesten erreichbaren Textgestalt, I, II (Berlin, 1907), pp. 973–978.

External links 

 
 Minuscule 892 at the Encyclopedia of Textual Criticism
 Add MS 33277 BL

Greek New Testament minuscules
9th-century biblical manuscripts